Herman Alexander Holshouser (January 20, 1907 – July 26, 1994) was an American professional baseball pitcher who appeared in 25 games, 24 of them in relief, in Major League Baseball as a member of the 1930 St. Louis Browns. Born in Rockwell, North Carolina, he attended the University of North Carolina at Chapel Hill.

Career
He began his nine-season pro career in 1926, and in his only big-league campaign, for the second-division Browns, Holshouser posted a 0–1 won–lost mark with one save, and a poor 7.80 earned run average. He allowed 103 hits and 28 bases on balls in 62 innings pitched, with 37 strikeouts. 

He twice won over 20 games in minor league baseball, in 1928 and 1933. Holshouser retired after the 1934 season and died in Concord, North Carolina, at the age of 87.

References

External links

1907 births
1994 deaths
Baltimore Orioles (IL) players
Baseball players from North Carolina
Binghamton Triplets players
Chattanooga Lookouts players
Indianapolis Indians players
Major League Baseball pitchers
New Haven Profs players
People from Rowan County, North Carolina
Providence Grays (minor league) players
Richmond Colts players
St. Louis Browns players
Salisbury-Spencer Colonials players
Wilkes-Barre Barons players